Pie Island is an island in Lake Superior, Ontario, Canada.

Pie Island may also refer to:
Eel Pie Island, an island in the River Thames, London
2Pie Island, an album by the British electronica group 2 Bit Pie